Silino may refer to:
Silino District, a district of the federal city of Moscow, Russia
Silino (rural locality), several rural localities in Russia
Silino, historical name of Selinog, the island barangay in the Philippines coterminous with Silino Island